In taxonomy, Picrophilus is an archaean genus of the family Picrophilaceae.

Picrophilus is an extremely acidophilic genus within Euryarchaeota. These microbes are the most acidophilic organisms currently known, with the ability to grow at a pH of less than 0.5. They were first isolated from samples taken from acidic hot springs and dry hot soil in Hokkaido (Japan). They are obligate acidophiles and are unable to maintain their membrane integrity at pH values above 4. While phylogenetically related to other organisms within Thermoplasmata, unlike Thermoplasma and Ferroplasma, Picrophilus contains an S-layer cell wall.

See also
 List of Archaea genera

References

Further reading

Scientific journals

Scientific books

Scientific databases

External links

 Picrophilus at Lifemap NCBI Version
 Picrophilaceae at OneZoom
 Picrophilus at LifeGate

Archaea genera